Carrie and David's Popshop is a children's musical television series aired on CBeebies, originally broadcast in 2008. It is presented by celebrity vocal coaches Carrie Grant and David Grant, with their pet dog Riff, puppeteered by Dave Chapman, and produced by BBC Scotland. Repeats originally finished on 28 October 2011, but an episode was aired to celebrate the channel's tenth birthday on 11 February 2012. Repeats returned on 7 September 2013 and repeats ended again in 2015.

Overview
Carrie and David took off the show by acting out a music-related situation that usually ends in them giving the viewer (behind the camera) an object. Then a warm-up song is sung. A child or children would then come into the popshop and ask for a song for a certain purpose (e.g. to skip going to bed or to get their dad to dance) then Carrie and David would have an idea (We're getting the feeling!) and sing a song asking what genre of music they want their song to be sung in. The customer would then leave awaiting their pod (see below). Unlike most current CBeebies programmes, Carrie & David wear the same clothes in every episode.

Then Carrie and David's dog Riff would 'prepare the zone' and sing a song about setting the equipment up. Carrie and David would expand their idea, come up with lyrics and decide what instruments to use, during which the object that the viewer was given earlier usually comes into use. Carrie and David then perform the song they have come up with and Riff records it on a pod. Riff hands the pod to the viewer who gives the pod to the original customer. When they open the pod stars come out and the video of their song comes out. They dance and sing along. The actors were used to play other parts in other episodes (i.e. brothers, sisters or relatives.) This is why so few actors were used in the production of Series 1 and 2. Most of the actors were Scottish and sourced from auditions nationwide.

The show was produced by Nigel P Harris for BBC Scotland.
The musical director is Andrew McCrorie-Shand who did the music for earlier programmes like Tots TV, and Teletubbies, and Rosie and Jim.

Songs
All songs are written by the Grants.  In a typical programme, the following songs will feature:

 Theme song
 Warm-up song –  usually Bounce, Bounce; Warm Up Your Voice; or Music Voices
 Is It This Or Is It That?
 Riff's song – In relation to his job in the popshop
 The customer's chosen song

Ratings

Series 1 (2008)
1. I Love to Sing: Customer: Sophie: Persephone Bell
2. I'm a Winner: Customer: Leah: Gemma Dodsworth
3. The World Gets Bigger: Customer: Aran: Dylan Bocking
4. How Am I Gonna Wake You Up?: Customers: Ruth & Molly: Sofie Gill & Serena Gill
5. Don't Wanna Go to Bed: Customers: Eloise & Emily: Katie Davie & Katie Bird-Tommy
6. Side to Side: Customer: Megan: Annie Pearson
7. Rain: Customer: Shannon: Bethan Kent
8. Kite: Customer: Ash: Krishna Odedra 
9. The Dream Team: Customer: Max: Andrew Vettraino
10. Tick Tock: Customer: Kirsty: Casey Dowling
11. Are Stars Magic: Customer: Oliver: John Bell
12. I've Lost My Smile: Customer: Adam: Luke Sanderson
13. On Safari: Customer: Laura: Lucy Currie
14. No One's You: Customer: Anna: Mairi Shaw
15. Scary Music: Customers: Zak & Lewis: Luke Davies & Alex Goodchild
16. No Longer Grumpy: Customer: Ailsa: Amelia Hewitt
17. I Like Being Me: Customer: Ben: Joe Slater
18. Yum Yum Yum: Customer: Luke: Adam Jolly
19. Until the End of Time: Customer: Jack: Samuel Edwards
20. Fly Away: Customers: Rashmi & Courtney: Abirami Vijayan & Sophie Reid
21. I Want a New Story: Customer: Alicia: Demi-Mae Yip
22. Sorry: Customer: Chloe: Erin Towers Burns
23. New Home for Me: Customer: Matt: Michael Kelly
24. Check Me: Customers: Zoe & Dan: Nicoll Gilhepsie & Oliver Speed
25. I Wanna Thank You: Customer: Ryan: Markus Person
26. My Washing Song: Customer: Tyler: Cian Cheesbrough
27. School is Cool: Customer: Liam: William Ritchie
28. United: Customer: Muddasir: Mubeen Zafar
29. Make Time for Sharing: Customer: Todd: Joe Gardner
30. Make Some Noise: Customer: Dylan: Mark Wood

References

External links
 
 Carrie and David's Popshop at the CBeebies Website

BBC children's television shows
British television shows featuring puppetry
2008 British television series debuts
2008 British television series endings
2000s British children's television series
British preschool education television series
CBeebies
Television series by BBC Studios
2000s preschool education television series